The 1977 European Tour was a series of golf tournaments that comprised the Professional Golfers' Association (PGA) European Tournament Players’ Division circuit. It is officially recognised as the sixth season of the PGA European Tour.

Historically, the PGA's Order of Merit only included tournaments in Great Britain and Ireland, but in 1970 events in continental Europe were included for the first time. The circuit and organisation evolved further over the following years, with the Tournament Players’ Division reaching an agreement to join with their continental counterparts, the Continental Tournament Players' Association, in December 1976 and as a result added the word "European" to their name for the 1977 season. The title of the circuit was changed to the PGA European Golf Tour in 1979.

The season was made up of 22 tournaments counting for the Order of Merit, and some non-counting tournaments that later became known as "Approved Special Events". The schedule included the major national opens around Europe, with the other tournaments mostly held in England and Scotland.

The Order of Merit was won by Spain's Seve Ballesteros.

Changes for 1977
There were several changes from the previous season, with the addition of the Callers of Newcastle and the Tournament Players Championship, which replaced the Piccadilly Medal. Two events not counting for the Order of Merit, the Phillip Morris Nations Cup and the Sumrie Better-Ball, originally pencilled in for May, were cancelled.

Schedule
The following table lists official events during the 1977 season.

Unofficial events
The following events were sanctioned by the European Tour, but did not carry official money, nor were wins official.

Order of Merit
The Order of Merit was based on prize money won during the season, calculated in Pound sterling.

Awards

See also
List of golfers with most European Tour wins

Notes

References

External links
1977 season results on the PGA European Tour website
1977 Order of Merit on the PGA European Tour website

European Tour seasons
European Tour